The 2007 Masters Series Hamburg presented by E.ON Hanse was the 101st edition of the Hamburg Masters tennis tournament. Roger Federer defeated Rafael Nadal, ending Nadal's 81-match winning streak on clay. Carlos Moyà reached his first Masters Series semifinal in three years, after languishing well outside the top-20 at the start of the year. Lleyton Hewitt was also a surprise semi-finalist pushing Nadal to three sets. This was Hewitt's first masters semi-final since Indian Wells in 2005. Bob Bryan and Mike Bryan won the doubles title.

As the penultimate event before the 2007 French Open, it was now believed that Federer represented a significant threat to Nadal's reign as the King of Clay. Federer himself said that he had found the formula to beat Nadal on clay. However, Nadal was able to retain his French Open crown in four sets.

Finals

Singles

 Roger Federer defeated  Rafael Nadal 2–6, 6–2, 6–0

Doubles

 Bob Bryan /  Mike Bryan defeated  Paul Hanley /  Kevin Ullyett 6–3, 6–4

References

External links
  
   
 Association of Tennis Professionals (ATP) tournament profile